The 1988 Milan–San Remo was the 79th edition of the Milan–San Remo cycle race and was held on 19 March 1988. The race started in Milan and finished in San Remo. The race was won by Laurent Fignon of the Système U team.

General classification

References

1988
March 1988 sports events in Europe
1988 in road cycling
1988 in Italian sport